The State Treasurer of Montana was an elected constitutional officer in the executive branch of the state government of Montana, and was responsible for directly overseeing the financial operations of state government. It was created in the 1889 Constitution and was abolished following the adoption of the 1972 Constitution. Following the ratification of the 1972 Constitution, the office's duties were transferred to the Montana Department of Administration.

List of state treasurers

Parties

See also

List of governors of Montana
List of lieutenant governors of Montana
List of attorneys general of Montana
Political party strength in Montana

References

External links

Treasurer
State treasurers of the United States